The official translation used by the state church, the Evangelical Lutheran Church of Finland, is approved by . There have been three official translations:  (1642),  (1933/1938), and the current one  (1992/2007). The term kirkkoraamattu means that the edition has to be suited for service of worship and other needs of the church.

The 1933/1938 Bible was translated using the technique of formal equivalence. This is also the principle of the current official translation from 1992/2007.

Background
Translations of the Bible into Finnish have their background in the Reformation and birth of humanism. The Luther Bible (1534) continued to impact Finnish translations for centuries to come.

Translations

The first Finnish translation of the Bible was Mikael Agricola's translation of the New Testament: Se Wsi Testamenti Somexi (The New Testament in Finnish). Agricola started working on the translation while he was studying in Germany between 1536 and 1539, or perhaps even earlier. It was published in 1548. Agricola also translated parts of the Old Testament. It is likely that Agricola had assistants. Agricola's translations drew influence from various sources: the Vulgate, Desiderius Erasmus's Greek Novum Instrumentum omne (1516), the Luther Bible, and the Gustav Vasa Bible (1541). Agricola is today considered the father of literary Finnish.

The first translation of the whole Bible was the so-called Vanha kirkkoraamattu (Old Church Bible), titled  (1642). This edition was translated between 1638 and 1641 by a committee led by Bishop Isaacus Rothovius and was published in 1642. It was revised in between 1683 and 1685 (Florinus). It is still used by some, although as a revised edition.

As the Finnish written and spoken language evolved during the centuries and literacy became commonplace also amongst the laypeople, a need for a new edition arose. The so-called Biblia or Vuoden 1776 raamattu (1776 Bible) was published in 1776. This was the first edition meant not only for ecclesiastical but also for domestic use, and was the first to be written in Modern Finnish. It was revised in 1859. The 1776 Bible is the version used by two revival movements (the Laestadians and the "Beseechers") within the Evangelical Lutheran Church of Finland even today. This is because it, unlike the newer translations, is based on the Textus Receptus, as is, for instance, the English King James Version.

Again a new translation was needed in the early 20th century, and a translation committee was set up in 1911. It had its work ready 1933. The full edition of the Bible was published in 1938. It was translated by the Finnish Lutheran Church and intended for Lutheran use. As the method of translation was "one source language word - one Finnish word". The 1938 edition consisted of Old Testament, deuterocanonicals and New Testament. In translation, it uses the technique of formal equivalence. The language was archaic even contemporaneously as it aimed to create a solemn mood against both the meaning of the original text as well as conventions of the Finnish language.

The translation proved short-lived, because of the publication of Uusi kirkkoraamattu (New Church Bible) in 1992. The translation technique used in Uusi testamentti nykysuomeksi is that of dynamic equivalence.

The latest official Finnish translation dates from 1992, the so-called   (New Church Bible). It is the first Finnish ecumenical edition; the translation committee consisted not only of the representatives of the Finnish Lutheran Church, but also of academics and representatives of the Finnish Orthodox Church and Finnish Catholic Church, and is intended for the use of all Christian denominations. The translation technique used in the 1992 edition is dynamic equivalence, and it aims to use ordinary standard Finnish. The initial edition consisted of only the New and Old Testaments: the translation of the Old Testament deuterocanonicals were finished only in 2004.

Uusi kirkkoraamattu was criticized by some as deviating from the original text because of its contextual translation. These critiques sparked a new translation, Raamattu kansalle (Bible for the People), 1999/2012. It strives to use modern Finnish. Another new translation, Jumalan Kansan Pyhä Raamattu (1992; Holy Bible of the People of God) is largely based on the 1933/1938 Church Bible and attempts to correct some errors in it. Both Raamattu kansalle and Jumalan Kansan Pyhä Raamattu return to the principle of formal equivalence used in the 1933/1938 bible.

Uuden Maailman käännös (New World Translation) is an unofficial Finnish translation of the Bible, used by Jehovah's Witnesses. It has been translated from its English version rather than from the original Aramaic and Greek.

The Union of Independent Evangelical Lutheran Congregations in Finland has its own translation of the New Testament and Psalms, published first in 1935 (NT) and 1949 (Psalms) and revised in 1983.

Recently, parts of the Bible have been translated to dialects of Finnish.

Comparison

See also

Christianity in Finland

References

Further reading

External links

Full text of the 1992 Church Bible
Full text of the 1938 Church Bible
Finnish Wikipedia category: Finnish Bible translations Suomalaiset raamatunkäännökset
Finnish
Finnish literature